Anders James Rowe (born 9 May 2002) is a motorcycle speedway rider from England.

Career
Rowe started riding for the Kent Kings during the 2018 National League speedway season and helped them win the National Trophy and Pairs Championship. He then joined Somerset Rebels for the SGB Championship 2019. The same year he won the 2019 National League Riders' Championship.

In 2021, he moved up to the SGB Premiership and started riding for Ipswich Witches, as well as riding in the lower division for Redcar Bears. In 2022, he stayed with the Ipswich Witches in the SGB Premiership 2022 and joined Leicester Lions in the SGB Championship 2022. Later that season he switched from Leicester to Scunthorpe Scorpions.

In 2023, Rowe will ride for Poole Pirates in Great Britain, and Rzeszów in Poland.

References 

2002 births
Living people
British speedway riders
Ipswich Witches riders
Kent Kings riders
Leicester Lions riders
Poole Pirates riders
Redcar Bears riders
Scunthorpe Scorpions riders
Somerset Rebels riders